Jorge Volio Jiménez (August 26, 1882 – October 20, 1955) was a Costa Rican priest, soldier and politician.

Biography
Jorge Volio was born August 26, 1882, in Cartago, Costa Rica to Carlos Volio Llorente and Matilde Jiménez Oreamuno. In 1901, he graduated with a baccalaureate in humanities with distinction (bachiller en humanidades con Distinción Unánime) from the Liceo de Costa Rica. In 1903, he traveled to Belgium to study at the León XII Seminary of the University of Leuven. While in Europe, he also studied at the Saint-Sulpice Seminary of Paris and at the University of Freiburg. In 1906, he graduated magna cum laude in philosophy. In 1909, he was ordained as a priest of the Roman Catholic Church.

After returning from Europe to Costa Rica, Volio went to Nicaragua to join Augusto César Sandino's guerilla army, the liberales, in the struggle against the United States occupation of Nicaragua. He achieved the rank of general. Returning to Costa Rica to teach, he was persecuted by the military dictatorship of Federico Tinoco Granados. In 1919, he joined the Sapoá Revolution against Tinoco's regime. When the revolution failed, Volio made unsuccessful attempts to organize invasions from Panama and Nicaragua to oust the ruling junta.

In 1922, Volio was seated in the Legislative Assembly of Costa Rica, representing the independence party of San Ramón. In 1923, he founded the Reform Party (Partido Reformista) to fight for the working class and the poor. He ran as the Reform Party candidate for President of Costa Rica in 1924, coming in third behind Ricardo Jiménez Oreamuno (Partido Republicano Nacional) and Alberto Echandi Montero (Partido Agrícola). Later, he served as director of the National Archives. Volio retired from active politics in 1936, dedicating himself to farming in Sierpe, Osa Canton.

When the University of Costa Rica was opened in 1940, Volio was asked to join the faculty. He was named a professor of philosophy and national history and Dean of the Faculty of Philosophy and Letters.

Volio served twice as a deputy for the Partido Republicano Nacional Independiente, in 1953 and 1955. He died October 20, 1955.

Members of the Legislative Assembly of Costa Rica
Vice presidents of Costa Rica
1882 births
1955 deaths
People from Cartago Province